Sport Toplumy Stadium is a multi-purpose stadium in Türkmenabat, Turkmenistan. It is currently used mostly for football matches and serves as the home for FC Bagtyyarlyk-Lebap. The stadium holds 10,000 people.

History 
The sports complex started build in April 2008. Construction works carried out by Russian company Itera. The project cost $20 million. Opened at May 2009.

References

External links 
Stadium picture

Football venues in Turkmenistan
Multi-purpose stadiums in Turkmenistan